Bădescu is a Romanian surname that may refer to:

 Andrei Bădescu
 Constantion Bădescu
 Ionuț Bădescu
 Gheorghe Bădescu
 Otilia Bădescu
 Ramona Badescu (author)
 Ramona Badescu

Others 
 Valea lui Bădescu River

See also 
 Badea (disambiguation)
 Bădeni (disambiguation)
 Bădila (disambiguation)
 Bădești (disambiguation)

Romanian-language surnames